Tibau do Sul is a municipality in the state of Rio Grande do Norte in the Northeast region of Brazil.

See also
List of municipalities in Rio Grande do Norte

References

External links
 
Municipalities in Rio Grande do Norte
Populated coastal places in Rio Grande do Norte